Sins of Man is a 1936 American drama film, directed by Otto Brower and released by 20th Century Fox. It stars Jean Hersholt, Don Ameche, and Allen Jenkins.

Plot

Cast
Jean Hersholt as Christopher Freyman
Don Ameche as Karl Freyman / Mario Signarelli
Allen Jenkins as Crusty
J. Edward Bromberg as Anton Engel
Ann Shoemaker as Anna Engel
DeWitt Jennings as Twichelesko
Fritz Leiber as Father Prior
Francis Ford as Town Drunk
Christian Rub as Fritz
Adrian Rosley as Singarelli's Butler
Gene Reynolds as Karl Freyman as a Boy
Mickey Rentschler as Gabriel Freyman as a Boy
John Miltern as Mr. Hall
Paul Stanton as Minister
Edward Van Sloan as Austrian Army Doctor

References

External links

 

1936 films
American drama films
1936 drama films
Films directed by Otto Brower
American black-and-white films
Films based on works by Joseph Roth
Films based on Austrian novels
Films set in Austria
Films set in the 1900s
Films set in the 1910s
Films about deaf people
Films directed by Gregory Ratoff
20th Century Fox films
1930s American films